Robin Johnston(e) may refer to:

Robin Knox-Johnston, English sailor
Robin Johnstone, British rower
Robin Johnstone (figure skater)

See also
Robin Johnson (disambiguation)